The 1964–65 Ice hockey Bundesliga season was the seventh season of the Ice hockey Bundesliga, the top level of ice hockey in Germany. Eight teams participated in the league, and EV Fussen won the championship.

First round

Final round

Qualification round

Relegation

References

Eishockey-Bundesliga seasons
German sport
Bund